Kaikadi may refer to:

 Kaikadi people, a formerly nomadic Indian tribe
 Kaikadi language, their language
 Kaikadi (dog), a breed of sighthound

Language and nationality disambiguation pages